Frank John "Butch" Loebs (January 10, 1913 – June 13, 1977) was an American football player and coach. He served as the head football coach at Washington University in St. Louis from 1940 to 1941, compiling a record of 7–11. Loebs played college football at Purdue University as an end.  He was a third-round pick for the New York Giants in the 1936 NFL Draft. Prior to becoming head coach at Washington University, he served for three seasons as an assistant coach there.

Head coaching record

References

External links
 

1913 births
1977 deaths
American football ends
Purdue Boilermakers football players
Washington University Bears football coaches
Sportspeople from Cleveland
Players of American football from Cleveland